Kheshtianak (also Romanized as Kheshtīānak, Kheshtyānak, and Kishtiyānāk) is a village in Gudarzi Rural District, Oshtorinan District, Borujerd County, Lorestan Province, Iran. At the 2006 census, its population was 675, in 173 families.

References 

Towns and villages in Borujerd County